Narali Jabair is a village in the UC Changa Bangial, Gujar Khan Tehsil of Rawalpindi District,  Punjab, Pakistan.  
Notable people.
Haji abdul Majeed.(U.K)
Malik Muhammed Idrees
Sub Malik Muhammed Fazal
Nambardar Malik Rafique 
Sub Malik Yaseen
Sekander Shabir 

Most of the population of the village is Gangal Awan.
 Post Coad 49764

External links
 http://placesmap.net/PK/Jamia-Masjid-Al-Rehman-128786/
 https://www.dailymotion.com/video/x2p5vtx

Villages in Gujar Khan Tehsil